Clystea daltha is a moth of the subfamily Arctiinae. It was described by Herbert Druce in 1895. It is found in Pará, Brazil.

References

Clystea
Moths described in 1895